Joseph A. Trillo (born 1943) is an American politician who served as a member of the Rhode Island House of Representatives from 2001 to 2017. During his tenure, he served as House deputy minority leader.

Career 
Trillo was elected to the Rhode Island House of Representatives in November 2000 and assumed office in January 2001. He is also a former national committeeman for the Rhode Island Republican Party. Trillo announced his candidacy as an Independent for governor of Rhode Island on December 5, 2017.

Personal life 
Trillo's ancestors are from Isoletta in Ciociaria, Latium, south of Rome.

References

1943 births
21st-century American politicians
American people of Italian descent
Emerson College alumni
Living people
Members of the Rhode Island House of Representatives
Politicians from Providence, Rhode Island
Politicians from Warwick, Rhode Island
Rhode Island Independents
Rhode Island Republicans